John Climacus, also known as John of the Ladder, John Scholasticus and John Sinaites, was a 6th–7th-century Christian monk at the monastery on Mount Sinai. He is revered as a saint by the Latin Catholic, Eastern Orthodox and Eastern Catholic churches.

History 
There is almost no information about John's life. There is in existence an ancient vita (life) of the saint by a monk named Daniel of Raithu monastery. Daniel, though claiming to be a contemporary, admits to no knowledge of John's origins—any detail on John's birth is the result of much later speculation, and is confined to references in the Menologion. The Vita is generally unhelpful for establishing dates of any kind. Formerly scholarship, on the basis of John's entry in the Menologion, had placed him in the latter 6th century. That view was challenged by J. C. Guy and others, and consensus (such as there is) has shifted to a 7th century provenance. If Daniel's vita is trustworthy (there is nothing against which to judge its accuracy), then John came to the Vatos Monastery at Mount Sinai, now Saint Catherine's Monastery, and became a novice when he was about 16 years old. He was taught about the spiritual life by the elder monk Martyrius. After the death of Martyrius, John, wishing to practice greater asceticism, withdrew to a hermitage at the foot of the mountain. In this isolation he lived for some twenty years, constantly studying the lives of the saints and thus becoming one of the most learned Church Fathers. 

In the meantime, this tradition has been proven to be historically implausible. The artful rhetorical figures in his writings, as well as philosophical forms of thought indicate a solid academic education, as was customary for a profession in administration and law during his epoch. Such training could not be acquired in Sinai. 

In addition, biographical observations indicate that he probably lived by the sea, probably in Gaza, and apparently practiced law there. It was only after his wife's death, in his early forties, that he entered the Sinai Monastery. These findings also explain the horizon and the literary quality of his writings, which have a clear philosophical background. The legend of his renunciation of the world at the age of 16 is based on the motive of portraying him as untouched by secular education, as is found in other biographies of saints. Their roots in theological and philosophical educational traditions are deliberately blurred.

When he was about sixty-five years of age, the monks of Sinai persuaded him to become their hegumen. He acquitted himself of his functions as abbot with the greatest wisdom, and his reputation spread so far that, according to the Vita, Pope Gregory the Great wrote to recommend himself to his prayers, and sent him a sum of money for the hospital of Sinai, in which the pilgrims were wont to lodge.

Of John's literary output we know only the Κλῖμαξ or The Ladder of Divine Ascent, composed in the early seventh century at the request of John, Abbot of Raithu, a monastery situated on the shores of the Red Sea, and a shorter work To the Pastor (Latin: Liber ad Pastorem), most likely a sort of appendix to the Ladder. It is in the Ladder that we hear of the ascetic practice of carrying a small notebook to record the thoughts of the monk during contemplation.

The Ladder describes how to raise one's soul and body to God through the acquisition of ascetic virtues. Climacus uses the analogy of Jacob's Ladder as the framework for his spiritual teaching. Each chapter is referred to as a "step", and deals with a separate spiritual subject. There are thirty Steps of the ladder, which correspond to the age of Jesus at his baptism and the beginning of his earthly ministry. Within the general framework of a 'ladder', Climacus' book falls into three sections. The first seven Steps concern general virtues necessary for the ascetic life, while the next nineteen (Steps 8–26) give instruction on overcoming vices and building their corresponding virtues. The final four Steps concern the higher virtues toward which the ascetic life aims. The final rung of the ladder—beyond prayer (προσευχή), stillness (ἡσυχία), and even dispassion (ἀπάθεια)—is love (ἀγάπη).

Originally written simply for the monks of a neighboring monastery, the Ladder swiftly became one of the most widely read and much-beloved books of Byzantine spirituality. This book is one of the most widely read among Orthodox Christians, especially during the season of Great Lent which immediately precedes Pascha (Easter). It is often read in the trapeza (refectory) in Orthodox monasteries, and in some places it is read in church as part of the Daily Office on Lenten weekdays, being prescribed in the Triodion.

An icon known by the same title, Ladder of Divine Ascent, depicts a ladder extending from earth to heaven. Several monks are depicted climbing a ladder; at the top is Jesus, prepared to receive them into Heaven. Also shown are angels helping the climbers, and demons attempting to shoot with arrows or drag down the climbers, no matter how high up the ladder they may be. Most versions of the icon show at least one person falling. Often, in the lower right corner John Climacus himself is shown, gesturing towards the ladder, with rows of monastics behind him.

Saint John's feast day is March 30 in both the East and West. The Eastern Orthodox Church and the Byzantine Catholic churches additionally commemorate him on the Fourth Sunday of Great Lent. Many churches are dedicated to him in Russia, including a church and belltower in the Moscow Kremlin. John Climacus was also known as "Scholasticus", but he is not to be confused with John Scholasticus, Patriarch of Constantinople.

Several translations into English have been made, including one by Holy Transfiguration Monastery (Boston, 1978). This volume contains the Life of St. John by Daniel, The Ladder of Divine Ascent, and To the Pastor, and provides footnotes explaining many of the concepts and terminology used from an Orthodox perspective, as well as a General Index.

See also 
 Søren Kierkegaard, who published several works under the pseudonym "Johannes Climacus" and two under the pseudonym "Anti-Climacus"
 Saint John Climacus, patron saint archive
 The Uncondemning Monk; also commemorated 30 March

References

External links 
 
 
 
 St John Climacus and the Ladder of Divine Ascent Sermon
 John Climacus: The Ladder of Divine Ascent by Colm Luibheid, John Henebry (Google Books)
 Excerpts from John Climacus
 St John Climacus (of the Ladder) Orthodox icon and synaxarion for Fourth Sunday of Great Lent
 Venerable John Climacus of Sinai, Author of "the Ladder" March 30 feast
 Pope Benedict XVI General Audience of Febr. 11, 2009 on John Climacus

579 births
649 deaths
6th-century Christian mystics
6th-century Christian saints
7th-century Byzantine writers
7th-century Christian mystics
7th-century Christian saints
7th-century Christian theologians
Christian abbots
Church Fathers
Roman Catholic monks
Eastern Orthodox monks
Hesychasts
Patristic mystics
Syrian Christian monks
Syrian Christian mystics
Miracle workers